The Real to Reel International Film Festival is held annually in Kings Mountain, North Carolina at the Joy Performance Center. It was founded in 2000. According to the official website, the goal is "to showcase thought-provoking films and offer a venue where movie lovers who appreciate independent vision can celebrate this unique art form." The Cleveland County Arts Council presented the 13th Annual “Real to Reel International Film Festival” from July 18–21, 2012 and the 14th annual festival was celebrated on July 24–27, 2013. The 17th Annual festival was celebrated July 27–30, 2016. www.realtoreelfest.com

The festival is located in the heart of North Carolina between Asheville and Charlotte, Cleveland County. The mission of the festival is to offer a forum for independent film, video and multi-media artists from around the world to showcase their talents and expose the works of these artists to the region.

The venue is the Joy Performance Center, located at 202 S. Railroad Ave., Kings Mountain, NC, a renovated classic theater from the 1940s in Kings Mountain.
The 2012 films were:

In Our Hands, Stop It, A Dangerous Place, Historias, Colored Confederates: Myth or Matter of Fact?, Guilt-Ridden, Live Outside the Box, Sterling Hallard Bright Drake, The Darkness is Close Behind, Escape, Echoes of Exxon, The High Price of Victory, Wheels, Sunshower, Dar He: The Lynching of Emmett Till, The Orphan, Money and Medicine, After I Pick the Fruit, The New Obsolete, Dislecksia: The Movie, The Miracles on Honey Bee Hill, Masque, When You Find Me, Connected: An Autoblogography about Love, Death & Technology

References

External links
 Official Website for Crazy
 IMDb entry for Crazy
 Official website for New Urban Cowboy. 
 IMDb entry for New Urban Cowboy: Toward a New Pedestrianism.
 IMDb entry for The Borinqueneers

Film festivals in North Carolina
Tourist attractions in Cleveland County, North Carolina
Tourist attractions in Gaston County, North Carolina